Terminal respiratory secretions (or simply terminal secretions), known colloquially as a death rattle, are sounds often produced by someone who is near death as a result of fluids such as saliva and bronchial secretions accumulating in the throat and upper chest. Those who are dying may lose their ability to swallow and may have increased production of bronchial secretions, resulting in such an accumulation. Usually, two or three days earlier, the symptoms of approaching death can be observed as saliva accumulates in the throat, making it very difficult to take even a spoonful of water. Related symptoms can include shortness of breath and rapid chest movement.  While death rattle is a strong indication that someone is near death, it can also be produced by other problems that cause interference with the swallowing reflex, such as brain injuries.

It is sometimes misinterpreted as the sound of the person choking to death or gargling.

Timing 
This symptom most commonly appears sometime during the last 24 hours of the person's life, although some people live somewhat longer.

Management 
The dying person is usually unaware of the noisy breathing and is not disturbed by it, but some healthcare providers attempt to minimize the sound for the emotional comfort of family members and caregivers.  This may be done through repositioning the person, reducing the volume of IV fluids being given, or giving anticholinergic drugs to reduce secretions. In hospice and palliative care, drugs such as glycopyrronium, hyoscine hydrobromide (scopolamine) or atropine may be used for their anticholinergic effects to reduce secretions and minimize this effect.

See also
 Agonal respiration
 End-of-life care

References

External links

 Pulmonary Breath Sounds, a page that includes a death rattle sound clip (published by East Tennessee State University)

Death
Sounds by type